The  1984 Air Canada Silver Broom, the men's world curling championship, was held from April 2–8 at the Memorial Auditorium in Duluth, Minnesota, United States.

Teams

Round-robin standings

Round-robin results

Draw 1

Draw 2

Draw 3

Draw 4

Draw 5

Draw 6

Draw 7

Draw 8

Draw 9

Tiebreaker

Playoffs

Semifinals

Final

External links

1984 in American sports
1984 in curling
1984 in sports in Minnesota
Curling in Minnesota
World Men's Curling Championship
Sports competitions in Duluth, Minnesota
April 1984 sports events in the United States
20th century in Duluth, Minnesota
International curling competitions hosted by the United States